Dentin (American English) or dentine ( or ) (British English) is a calcified tissue of the body and, along with enamel, cementum, and pulp, is one of the four major components of teeth. It is usually covered by enamel on the crown and cementum on the root and surrounds the entire pulp. By volume, 45% of dentin consists of the mineral hydroxyapatite, 33% is organic material, and 22% is water. Yellow in appearance, it greatly affects the color of a tooth due to the translucency of enamel. Dentin, which is less mineralized and less brittle than enamel, is necessary for the support of enamel. Dentin rates approximately 3 on the Mohs scale of mineral hardness. There are two main characteristics which distinguish dentin from enamel: firstly, dentin forms throughout life; secondly, dentin is sensitive and can become hypersensitive to changes in temperature due to the sensory function of odontoblasts, especially when enamel recedes and dentin channels become exposed.

Development
Prior to enamel formation, dentine formation begins through a process known as dentinogenesis, and this process continues throughout a person's life even after the tooth has fully developed. Events such as tooth decay and tooth wear can also initiate dentine formation.

Dentinogenesis is initiated by the odontoblasts of the pulp. Odontoblasts are specialised cells that lay down an organic matrix known as pre-dentine. This pre-dentine is subsequently mineralised into dentine. Mineralisation of pre-dentine begins at the dentino-enamel junction during tooth development and progresses towards the pulp of the tooth. After growth of pre-dentine and maturation into dentine, the cell bodies of the odontoblasts remain in the pulp, along its outer wall, and project into tiny tubules in the dentine.

Pre-dentine is composed of 90% type I collagen and 10% non-collagenous proteins (including phosphoproteins, proteoglycans, growth factors, phosphatases such as alkaline phosphatase, and matrix metalloproteinases (MMPs)), and this composition is significantly altered when it is mineralised into dentine. See the Structure section for information about the composition of dentine.

Structure 
Unlike enamel, dentin may be demineralized and stained for histological study. Dentin consists of microscopic channels, called dentinal tubules, which radiate outward through the dentin from the pulp to the exterior cementum or enamel border.<ref name="ross450">{{cite book | vauthors = Ross MH, Gordon IK, Wojciech P | date = 2003 | title = Histology: A Text and Atlas | edition = 4th | page = 450 | isbn = 978-0-683-30242-4}}</ref> The dentinal tubules extend from the dentinoenamel junction (DEJ) in the crown area, or dentinocemental junction (DCJ) in the root area, to the outer wall of the pulp. From the outer surface of the dentin to the area nearest the pulp, these tubules follow an S-shaped path. The diameter and density of the tubules are greatest near the pulp. Tapering from the inner to the outermost surface, they have a diameter of 2.5 μm near the pulp, 1.2 μm in the middle of the dentin, and 0.9 μm at the dentino-enamel junction. Their density is 59,000 to 76,000 per square millimeter near the pulp, whereas the density is only half as much near the enamel. Within the tubules, there is an odontoblast process, which is an extension of an odontoblast, and dentinal fluid, which contains a mixture of albumin, transferrin, tenascin and proteoglycans. In addition, there are branching canalicular systems that connect to each other.  These branches have been categorized by size, with major being 500-1000 nm in diameter, fine being 300-700 nm, and micro being less than 300 nm. The major branches are the terminal ends of the tubules. About every 1-2 μm, there are fine branches diverging from dentinal tubules at 45 degree angles. The microtubules diverge at 90 degree angles. The dentinal tubules contain the cytoplasmic extensions of odontoblasts that once formed the dentin and maintain it. The cell bodies of the odontoblasts are aligned along the inner aspect of dentin against a layer of predentin where they also form the peripheral boundary of the dental pulp Because of dentinal tubules, dentin has a degree of permeability, which can increase the sensation of pain and the rate of tooth decay. The strongest held theory of dentinal hypersensitivity suggests that it is due to changes in the dentinal fluid associated with the processes, a type of hydrodynamic mechanism.

Dentin is a bone-like matrix that is porous and yellow-hued material. It is made up, by weight, of 70-72% inorganic materials (mainly hydroxylapatite and some non-crystalline amorphous calcium phosphate), 20% organic materials (90% of which is collagen type 1 and the remaining 10% ground substance, which includes dentin-specific proteins), and 8-10% water (which is adsorbed on the surface of the minerals or between the crystals).Hillson, S. Teeth. 2nd ed. 2005. Page 184. . Because it is softer than enamel, it decays more rapidly and is subject to severe cavities if not properly treated, but due to its elastic properties, it is good support for enamel. Its flexibility prevents the brittle enamel fracturing.

In areas where both primary and secondary mineralization have occurred with complete crystalline fusion, these appear as lighter rounded areas on a stained section of dentin and are considered globular dentin. In contrast, the darker arc-like areas in a stained section of dentin are considered interglobular dentin. In these areas, only primary mineralization has occurred within the predentin, and the globules of dentin do not fuse completely. Thus, interglobular dentin is slightly less mineralized than globular dentin. Interglobular dentin is especially evident in coronal dentin, near the dentinoenamel junction (DEJ), and in certain dental anomalies, such as in dentinogenesis imperfecta.

 Regional variations in dentin structure and composition 

The different regions in dentin can be recognized due to their structural differences. The outermost layer, known as the mantle dentin layer, is found in the crown of the tooth. It can and can be identified by the presence of various characteristics, including collagen fibres found perpendicular to the enamel-dentin junction and it is slightly less mineralized (by approximately 5%, compared to the enamel. The dentin undergoes mineralization in the presence of matrix vesicles ("hydroxyapatite-containing, membrane-enclosed vesicles secreted by odontoblasts, osteoblasts, and some chondrocytes; believed to serve as nucleation centers for the mineralization process in dentin, bone, and calcified cartilage.") The dentinal tubules in this region branch profusely.

In the root of the tooth there are two morphologically distinguishable outer layers: the hyaline layer on the periphery of dentin and the granular layer of Tomes beneath this. The granular layer has a dark, granular appearance which occurs due to the branching and looping back of dentinal tubules in this region. This appearance, specific to root dentin, is possibly due to differences in the rates of formation of coronal and root dentin. The hyaline layer, which has an obscure origin, is a clear layer, unlike the granular layer, with a width of up to 20μm. It can have clinical significance during periodontal regeneration.

Circumpulpal dentin forms the majority of the dentin and is generally constant in structure. Peripherally, mineralization can be seen to be incomplete, whereas centrally the mineralizing front shows ongoing mineralizing.

The innermost layer of dentin is known as predentin, and is the initial dentin matrix that is laid down prior to mineralization. It can be distinguished by its pale color when stained with haematoxylin and eosin. The presence of odontoblastic processes here allows the secretion of matrix components. Predentin can be 10-40μm in width, depending on its rate of deposition.

Types
Dentin is classified into three types: primary, secondary, and tertiary. Secondary dentin is a layer of dentin formed after the tooth's root has fully formed. Tertiary dentin develops as a result of a stimulus, such as a carious attack or wear.

Primary dentin

Primary dentin, the most prominent dentin in the tooth, lies between the enamel and the pulp chamber (near dentinoenamel junction). The outer layer closest to enamel is known as mantle dentin.  This layer is unique to the rest of primary dentin.  Mantle dentin is formed by newly differentiated odontoblasts and forms a layer consistently 15-20 micrometers (µm) wide. Unlike primary dentin, mantle dentin lacks phosphorylation, has loosely packed collagen fibrils and is less mineralized. Below it lies the circumpulpal dentin, more mineralized dentin which makes up most of the dentin layer and is secreted after the mantle dentin by the odontoblasts. Circumpulpal dentin is formed before the root formation is completed.

Newly secreted dentin is unmineralized and is called predentin. It is easily identified in hematoxylin and eosin stained sections since it stains less intensely than dentin. It is usually 10-47μm and lines the innermost region of the dentin. It is unmineralized and consists of collagen, glycoproteins, and proteoglycans. It is similar to osteoid in bone and is thickest when dentinogenesis is occurring.

 Secondary dentin 

Secondary dentin (adventitious dentin) is formed after root formation is complete, normally after the tooth has erupted and is functional. It grows much more slowly than primary dentin but maintains its incremental aspect of growth. It has a similar structure to primary dentin, although its deposition is not always even around the pulp chamber. It appears greater in amounts on the roof and floor of the coronal pulp chamber, where it protects the pulp from exposure in older teeth. The secondary dentin formed is not in response to any external stimuli, and it appears very much similar to the primary dentine.  It is the growth of this dentin that causes a decrease in the size of the pulp chamber with age. This is clinically known as pulp recession; cavity preparation in young patients, therefore, carries a greater risk of exposing the pulp. If this occurs, the pulp can be treated by different therapies such as direct pulp capping. Previously it was thought that Pulp capping was most successful if followed by a stainless steel crown, however this procedure is most of the times unnecessary in children. it requires the unnecessary removal of enamel which is key to the life of the tooth. Adhesive dentistry allows for conservative restoration techniques that minimize the loss of tooth structure and should be used. In order to maintain space in the primary dentition, attempts are made not to extract a pulpal exposure.

Tertiary dentin (including reparative dentin or sclerotic dentin) – pathologic

Tertiary dentin is dentin formed as a reaction to external stimulation such as cavities and wear. It is of two types, either reactionary, where dentin is formed from a pre-existing odontoblast, or reparative, where newly differentiated odontoblast-like cells are formed due to the death of the original odontoblasts, from a pulpal progenitor cell. Tertiary dentin is only formed by an odontoblast directly affected by a stimulus; therefore, the architecture and structure depend on the intensity and duration of the stimulus, e.g., if the stimulus is a carious lesion, there is extensive destruction of dentin and damage to the pulp, due to the differentiation of bacterial metabolites and toxins. Thus, tertiary dentin is deposited rapidly, with a sparse and irregular tubular pattern and some cellular inclusions; in this case, it is referred to as "osteodentin". Osteodentin is seen in Vit.A deficiency during development. However, if the stimulus is less active, it is laid down less rapidly with a more regular tubular pattern and hardly any cellular inclusions. The speed at which tertiary dentin forms also varies substantially among primate species.

Defect and conditions
Dentinal sclerosis
Dentinal sclerosis or transparent dentin sclerosis of primary dentin is a change in the structure of teeth characterized by calcification of dentinal tubules. It can occur as a result of injury to dentin by caries or abrasion, or as part of the normal aging process.

Animal dentin
Elephant ivory is solid dentin. The structure of the dentinal tubules contributes to both its porosity  and its elasticity. Elephant tusks are formed with a thin cap of enamel, which soon wears away, leaving the dentin exposed. Exposed dentin in humans causes the symptom of sensitive teeth. Dentin is best known for its occurrence in teeth, but in early vertebrates, it was an important part of the dermal skeleton that covered most of the body, and it persists today in a few taxa such as the coelacanth.

Because dentin is softer than enamel, it wears away more quickly than enamel. Some mammalian teeth exploit this phenomenon, especially herbivores such as horses, deer or elephants. In many herbivores, the occlusal (biting) surface of the tooth is composed of alternating areas of dentin and enamel. Differential wearing causes sharp ridges of enamel to be formed on the surface of the tooth (typically a molar), and to remain during the working life of the tooth. Herbivores grind their molars together as they chew (masticate''), and the ridges help to shred tough plant material.

A material similar to dentin forms the hard material that makes up dermal denticles in sharks and other cartilaginous fish.

See also 
 Dentinogenesis
 Dentinogenesis imperfecta
 Odontoblast
 Tooth development

References

External links 

 
 

Parts of tooth
Tissues (biology)